The 2016 Gardner–Webb Runnin' Bulldogs football team represented Gardner–Webb University in the 2016 NCAA Division I FCS football season. They were led by fourth-year head coach Carroll McCray and played their home games at Ernest W. Spangler Stadium. They were a member of the Big South Conference. They finished the season 5–6, 3–2 in Big South play to finish in a tie for third place.

Schedule

Source: Schedule

Game summaries

at Elon

at Western Carolina

The Citadel

at Ohio

Benedict

Presbyterian

Coastal Carolina

Kennesaw State

at Liberty

at Charleston Southern

Monmouth

References

Gardner-Webb
Gardner–Webb Runnin' Bulldogs football seasons
Gardner-Webb Runnin' Bulldogs f